Eupithecia selinata is a moth of the family Geometridae. It is found from Japan through the Amur Region, Siberia, the Urals, Caucasus and Russia to western Europe and from southern Fennoscandia to the Alps.

The wingspan is 18–21 mm. The fore- and hindwings are dark greyish brown. There is one generation per year with adults on wing from the end of May to August.

The larvae feed on various Apiaceae species, including Aegopodium podagraria, Heracleum sphondylium, Peucedanum oreoselinum, Peucedanum palustre and Angelica sylvestris. Larvae can be found from June to September. It overwinters as a pupa.

Subspecies
Eupithecia selinata selinata
Eupithecia selinata fusei Inoue, 1980
Eupithecia selinata tenebricosa Dietze, 1910

References

External links

Lepiforum.de

Moths described in 1861
selinata
Moths of Asia
Moths of Europe
Taxa named by Gottlieb August Wilhelm Herrich-Schäffer